The 1921 Oregon Webfoots football team represented the University of Oregon in the Pacific Coast Conference (PCC) during the 1921 college football season.  In their fourth season under head coach Charles A. Huntington, the Webfoots compiled a 5–1–3 record (0–1–2 against PCC opponents), finished in fifth place in the PCC, and outscored their opponents, 145 to 75. The team played its home games at Hayward Field in Eugene, Oregon.

Schedule

References

Oregon
Oregon Ducks football seasons
Oregon Webfoots football